Rufus Sisson (September 11, 1890 – March 1977) was an All-American basketball player at Dartmouth College in 1911–12. He led the Eastern Intercollegiate Basketball League in scoring at 12.8 points per game in 10 games played. He was the first Dartmouth player to lead the league in scoring, and only the second All-American (George Grebenstein was named an All-American in 1906).

References

 

1890 births
1977 deaths
All-American college men's basketball players
Basketball players from New York (state)
Dartmouth Big Green men's basketball players
People from Potsdam, New York
American men's basketball players